Jens Peter Daniel Bogren (born 13 November 1979) is a Swedish record producer, mixer and recording engineer specializing in heavy metal music. He has worked on albums by Opeth, Dimmu Borgir, Sepultura, Arch Enemy, At the Gates, Katatonia, Babymetal, Soilwork, James LaBrie, Moonspell, God Forbid, Kreator, Devin Townsend, Ihsahn, Dark Tranquillity, Paradise Lost, Amon Amarth, DragonForce, The Ocean, Haken, Between the Buried and Me, Rotting Christ, Symphony X, Myrath, Angra, Dir En Grey, and Powerwolf, amongst others. Bogren lives in Örebro, Sweden and runs both Fascination Street Studios and Bogren Digital.

Discography

References

External links
Jens Bogren's discography at Discogs
Fascination Street Studios
Bogren Digital
Northern Music Co (Jens Bogren's Management)

Heavy metal producers
1979 births
Living people
Swedish record producers